RediRipe is a technology created at the University of Arizona which detects the production of ethylene, a natural ripening hormone, and displaying that detection by means of a color-changing sticker that changes from white to blue.

The technology was created in the lab of Mark Riley at the University of Arizona. In conjunction with the Eller College of Management's McGuire Center for Entrepreneurship, the technology was being developed into a viable business that will assist the apple and pear industries in their efforts to improve their efficiency by integrating technology into their age-old processes. Additionally, this technology has potential on other climacteric fruits which emit ethylene as they ripen.

References

External links

Food technology
University of Arizona
Agricultural technology